Pyrophosphatases, also known as diphosphatases, are acid anhydride hydrolases that act upon diphosphate bonds.

Examples include:
 Inorganic pyrophosphatase, which acts upon the free pyrophosphate ion
 Tobacco acid pyrophosphatase, which catalyses the hydrolysis of a phosphoric ester
 Various organic pyrophosphatases, which act upon organic molecules with the pyrophosphate group (but excluding triphosphatases that act on the final bond):
 Thiamine pyrophosphatase

See also

References

External links
 

EC 3.6.1